Terry Lin (born 6 July 1966) is a Taiwanese singer. He has been nominated for the Golden Melody Awards 5 times for Best Mandarin Male Artist. He is known for his clear and elegant androgynous voice, which utilizes different resonance in his head to 'mix' head voice and falsetto to effortlessly move to the high ranges and maintain power and volume despite his slight build. He has a combined range of 3 octaves but has spanned an additional octave while performing "Opera", a rearranged instrumental by Vitas, a song he stated he cannot practice (including perform) more than 4 times a day.  He later became the first Taiwanese artist to record his album in One Take and One Take Live with no further editing.

Life and career 
Lin was born in Keelung, Taiwan, and is the oldest of 3 children.  In 1991, as a university student, he formed the duo Ukulele with Lee Chi and gained attention in Taiwan and Hong Kong with their debut album "Confession" (認錯).  The band made 4 Mandarin albums, 2 English cover albums, and a compilation album before disbanding in 1996.  He was working at a power plant in a mine, but his colleague were all killed in a landslide, so he moved on to work in his father's family publishing company, for which he is still the equivalent of COO.  In 1999, he was forced to leave the music industry to care for his mother.  Nine months after the leave, his mother died, and the original publishing building was forced to rebuild due to a fire.

Lin went solo in 1995 and signed to Sony Music before setting up his own agency in 1997.  In 2018, he sung Mo Dao Zu Shi's opening song "Drunken dreams of a past life".

Influences 
While Terry Lin is fluent in Taiwanese Hokkien, and his ancestry is in Hokkien, China, his father does not think it suits him as his voice and pronunciation are not compatible. Terry has covered songs from artists such as Steel Heart, Celine Dion, Queen, Air Supply, Vitas, Simon & Garfunkel, Ardian Rrusta. He cited Air Supply as one of his biggest influences.

Philanthropy 
Terry Lin has been the Chairman of Taiwan Cancer Hope Fund since his mother's passing in 2001, and was awarded HKMT (Hong Kong, Macau and Taiwan-wide) Top Philanthropist Award in 2013.

Variety show

I Am a Singer Season 1 
In February 2013, he joined the first season of Hunan Television's I Am a Singer, where he finished runner-up.

Singer 2017 
In February 2017, Lin returned as a returning singer of the fifth season of I Am a Singer, which was renamed to Singer on that same season. He once again made it to the grand finals, this time finishing in fifth place.

Call Me By Fire
In 2021, he joined the cast of Call Me By Fire as a contestant.

References

1966 births
20th-century Taiwanese  male singers
21st-century Taiwanese male  singers
Living people
Taiwanese Mandopop singers
Musicians from Keelung